Herbert A. and Bettie E. Cress House is a historic home located at Warrensburg, Johnson County, Missouri. It was built about 1888, and is a -story, Queen Anne / Shingle Style frame dwelling. The first-story walls are of weatherboard (beveled siding), and the second-story walls are of sawn shingles. It sits on a sandstone foundation and features a full-width front porch and second story porch.

It was listed on the National Register of Historic Places in 1995.

References

Houses on the National Register of Historic Places in Missouri
Queen Anne architecture in Missouri
Shingle Style architecture in Missouri
Houses completed in 1888
Buildings and structures in Johnson County, Missouri
National Register of Historic Places in Johnson County, Missouri